"Downtown" is a song by American hip hop duo Macklemore & Ryan Lewis featuring fellow American musicians Eric Nally of Foxy Shazam, Melle Mel, Kool Moe Dee, and Grandmaster Caz. The song was officially released on August 27, 2015, as the lead single from the duo's second studio album This Unruly Mess I've Made (2016). A music video for the song was uploaded to Ryan Lewis' YouTube channel on the day of the song's release.

Background

On the song Macklemore said, "Ryan [Lewis] made a beat on the road called 'moping around,' I got the beat, I thought it said moped." "Coincidentally we had both purchased mopeds for being on the road so we could go around, leave the venues that we were performing at, and I wrote a song about mopeds, which now a year and a half later is out in the world."

Critical reception
AXS described the song as a sequel to the duo's successful single "Thrift Shop", while USA Today called it "a hip hop recreation of Bruno Mars and Mark Ronson's "Uptown Funk"." It came at #18 on the annual Triple J Hottest 100 for 2015. However, Time named "Downtown" the sixth-worst song of 2015.

Chart performance
In the United States, "Downtown" debuted on the Billboard Hot 100 chart dated September 12, 2015 at number 94. Its chart debut was fueled by sales of 11,000 digital downloads in its first two days, along with 886,000 domestic streams during the same period, nearly all from views of the song's music video. The next week, following its first full week of availability and a performance at the 2015 MTV Video Music Awards, the song jumped to number 18 with the week's largest gain in digital download sales, having sold 95,000 copies and logged 5.7 million streams for the week. It has since peaked at number 12. As of November 2015, "Downtown" has sold 772,000 copies domestically. Macklemore and Ryan Lewis also performed the song live on The Tonight Show Starring Jimmy Fallon on September 9, 2015.

In Australia, "Downtown" entered the Australian Singles Chart at number nine as the second highest debut on the week commencing September 7, 2015. The song rose to number two on the week commencing September 14, 2015. On the week commencing October 5, 2015, "Downtown" replaced Justin Bieber's "What Do You Mean?" at number one after being blocked from the position for three weeks, becoming Macklemore & Ryan Lewis' fourth number one single in the country. It has since been certified triple platinum by the Australian Recording Industry Association (ARIA).

Music video
The official music video for the song was uploaded on August 27, 2015, to Ryan Lewis' YouTube channel. It was directed by Macklemore, Lewis, and Jason Koenig, and was filmed in Spokane, Washington. Ken Griffey Jr. is featured in the music video. As of March 2022, it has over 228,000,000 views on YouTube.

In popular culture

Media
"Downtown" was used in the movie trailers for Dirty Grandpa, along with the trailers for The Secret Life of Pets.

In July 2018, the Seattle Police Department created a music video set to "Downtown" as part of a lip-sync video competition between police departments across the United States that was popular at the time.

This was used in 2018 film Hotel Transylvania 3: Summer Vacation, the song was sung by a group of Fish Men in the film.

Track listing

Charts

Weekly charts

Year-end charts

Certifications

Release history

References

2015 singles
2015 songs
Macklemore songs
Ryan Lewis songs
Songs written by Macklemore
Songs written by Ryan Lewis
Number-one singles in Australia